Huijiang Station is a metro station on Line 2 of the Guangzhou Metro located under the junction of Shibei Avenue and Shizhong Second Road in the Panyu District of Guangzhou.

Neighboring building  
 Huijiang Industrial Zone

Railway stations in China opened in 2010
Guangzhou Metro stations in Panyu District